New Springfield is an unincorporated community and census-designated place in southern Springfield Township, Mahoning County, Ohio, United States. The population was 579 at the 2020 census. It is part of the Youngstown–Warren metropolitan area. It lies at the intersection of State Routes 165 and 617.

Demographics

History
New Springfield was platted in the early 1820s. A post office called New Springfield has been in operation since 1828, which bears the ZIP code 44443.

Education
Children in New Springfield are served by the Springfield Local School District. The current schools serving the community are:
Springfield Local Elementary School – grades K-4
Springfield Local Intermediate School – grades 5-8
Springfield Local High School – grades 9-12

References

Unincorporated communities in Mahoning County, Ohio
1820s establishments in Ohio
Unincorporated communities in Ohio